The Quinn Canyon Range is a remote group of mountains in northeastern Nye County, and western Lincoln County in central Nevada in the western United States. Adaven is the only settlement in the mountains, now abandoned.

It is closely associated with the Grant Range, which connects to it at the mountain pass of Cherry Creek Summit .  From there, the range runs for approximately 33 miles to the southwest.  To the west is the large Railroad Valley, to the east is White River Valley, and to the south is Sand Spring Valley.

The Quinn Canyon and Grant Ranges are adjacent to the Basin and Range National Monument created by President Barack Obama in 2015, being excellent examples of the Great Basin and the Basin and Range Province.  The higher elevations of the range are protected as the Quinn Canyon Wilderness.

The sagebrush cinquefoil (Potentilla johnstonii) is a rare species of plant that has only been seen in the Quinn Canyon Range.

The range hosts only one settlement, now a ghost town; called Adaven.

References

External links 

 

Mountain ranges of Nevada
Mountain ranges of the Great Basin
Mountain ranges of Nye County, Nevada
Mountain ranges of Lincoln County, Nevada